The Bigerriones or Begerri were an Aquitani tribe dwelling in present-day Bigorre during the Iron Age. 

They were subjugated in 56 BC by the Roman forces of Caesar's legatus P. Licinius Crassus.

Name 
They are mentioned as Bigerriones by Caesar (mid-1st c. BC), and as Begerri (var. Begerbi, Bebergi, Bergebi) by Pliny (1st c. AD).

The Bigorre region, attested as Begorra ca. 400 AD, is named after the tribe.

Geography 
The Bigerriones lived in the Bigorre region, in the northern foreland of the Pyrenees. Their territory was located north of the Onobrisates, south of the Atures, Elusates and Auscii, east of the Venarni, and west of the Volcae Tectosages.

Their chief town was known as Bigorra Castrum (modern Saint-Lézer).

Culture 
It is believed the Bigerriones spoke a form or dialect of the Aquitanian language, a precursor of the Basque language.

See also 
 Aquitani
 Gallia Aquitania

References

Bibliography

Aquitani
Basque history